The 1970 Nippon Professional Baseball season was the 21st season of operation of Nippon Professional Baseball (NPB).

Regular season

Standings

League leaders

Central League

Pacific League

Awards
Most Valuable Player
Sadaharu Oh, Yomiuri Giants (CL)
Masaaki Kitaru, Lotte Orions (PL)
Rookie of the Year
Kenichi Yazawa, Chunichi Dragons (CL)
Michio Sato, Nankai Hawks (PL)
Eiji Sawamura Award
Masaji Hiramatsu, Taiyo Whales (CL)

References